Straight from the Shoulder is a lost 1921 American silent Western film directed by Bernard J. Durning and starring Buck Jones. It was produced and distributed by Fox Film Corporation.

Cast
 Buck Jones as Buck
 Helen Ferguson as Maggie
 Norman Selby as Bill Higgins
 Frances Hatton as Mrs Bill Higgins
 Herschell Mayall as Joseph Martin
 Yvette Mitchell as Gladys Martin
 G. Raymond Nye as Big Ben Williams
 Glen Cavender as Pete
 Dan Crimmins as Hotel Owner
 Ethelbert Knott as The Parson (as Albert Knot)
 Louis King as Rogers (as Lewis King)

See also
 1937 Fox vault fire

References

External links
 
 

1921 films
1921 Western (genre) films
1921 lost films
American black-and-white films
Fox Film films
Lost American films
Lost Western (genre) films
Silent American Western (genre) films
Films directed by Bernard Durning
1920s American films
1920s English-language films